is a passenger railway station located in the city of Hamura, Tokyo, Japan, operated by East Japan Railway Company (JR East).

Lines 
Hamura Station is served by the Ōme Line, and is located 11.7 kilometers from the starting point of the line at Tachikawa Station.

Station layout 
This station has a single ground-level island platform serving two tracks, with an elevated station building above the platform. The station is staffed.

Platforms

History
The station opened on 19 November 1894. With the privatization of Japanese National Railways (JNR) on 1 April 1987, the station came under the control of JR East.

Passenger statistics
In fiscal 2019, the station was used by an average of 13,687 passengers daily (boarding passengers only).

The passenger figures for previous years are as shown below.

Surrounding area
 Tama River
Hamura City Hall

See also
 List of railway stations in Japan

References

External links

  

Railway stations in Tokyo
Railway stations in Japan opened in 1894
Hamura, Tokyo
Ōme Line